Male is a live album by Foetus in Excelsis Corruptus Deluxe.  It records the Foetus live performance of November 3, 1990 in Manhattan's famed CBGB nightclub.  A film of this performance, also titled Male, was also released.

Though there is no indication on the album itself, the discography included with the Sink reissue identifies Male as Ectopic Ents #ECT ENTS 005.

Track listing

"Death Rape 2000," "Stumbo," and "Someone Drowned in My Pool" originally by Thirlwell's Wiseblood project.
"Faith Healer" is a cover of The Sensational Alex Harvey Band.
"Behemoth" is a cover of TAD.
"Puppet Dude" is a reworked cover of Elton John's "Rocket Man."

Personnel
Clint Ruin - vocals
Algis Kizys - Bass
David Ouimet - Samplers, Trombone
Norman Westberg - Guitar
Hahn Rowe - Violin, Guitar
Vinnie Signorelli - drums

Production
J. G. Thirlwell - Production, execution
Mark Ohe - Execution
Martin Bisi - Mixing engineer, mastering

Concert film

In 1993, a year after the album hit stores, the Male performance was released as concert film on VHS by Self Immolation/Atavistic.  Instead of a straight video of the concert, the Male film applies simple video effects to the raw footage.  A DVD version of the film was released by Music Video Distributions in 2003.

Film track listing
"Free James Brown"
"Fin"
"Hot Horse"
"English Faggot"
"Faith Healer"
"Honey I'm Home"
"Butterfly Potion"
"I'll Meet You in Poland Baby"
"Anything (Viva!)"
"Death Rape 2000"
"Stumbo"
"Behemoth"
"Your Salvation"

References

External links 
 
 Male at foetus.org

Foetus (band) albums
Albums produced by JG Thirlwell
1992 live albums
1993 video albums
Live video albums
Albums recorded at CBGB
Thirsty Ear Recordings live albums